The 1931–32 Chicago Black Hawks season was the team's sixth season in the NHL, and they were coming off of their first ever Stanley Cup finals appearance, as they lost to the Montreal Canadiens in 5 games in the 1931 finals.  The Hawks would not bring back Dick Irvin as head coach though, as they rehired Bill Tobin, who coached the Hawks at the end of the 1929–30 season.  Despite finishing with an under .500 record, as the Hawks would get 47 points in 48 games, the team finished in 2nd place in the American Division, and would qualify for the playoffs for the 3rd straight season.

The Black Hawks would be led offensively by Johnny Gottselig, who led the club with 13 goals and 28 points, while Tom Cook would finish just behind him with 12 goals and 25 points.  Mush March would have a big season, scoring 12 goals and earning 22 points, while leading the club with 59 penalty minutes.

In goal, Chuck Gardiner would win the Vezina Trophy, as the Black Hawks would have the fewest goals against in the entire league.  Gardiner would win 18 games, post a 1.85 GAA and have 4 shutouts.

One seemingly routine regular season game was recalled 30 years later in a February 1, 1962, episode of ABC television's The Untouchables, titled "Silent Partner" in which one of the characters, agent Lee Hobson, goes to the Black Hawks game vs. the New York Americans. The game was played on March 4, 1932, but narrator Walter Winchell's script put the date at March 5, possibly because researchers would have found stories about the night game in the next morning's newspapers. The show got the 6–1 Black Hawk victory correct, but it cannot be determined if Winchell's remark of attendance of 7,000 was also correct.

Chicago would face the Toronto Maple Leafs in the opening round of the playoffs for the 2nd straight year, however, unlike the previous season, the Black Hawks could not defeat Toronto in the 2 game total goal series, as the Leafs would eliminate the Hawks by a 6–2 score.

Season standings

Record vs. opponents

Schedule and results

Regular season

Playoffs

Toronto Maple Leafs 6, Chicago Black Hawks 2

Player statistics

Scoring leaders

Goaltending

Playoff stats

Scoring leaders

Goaltending

References

SHRP Sports
The Internet Hockey Database
National Hockey League Guide & Record Book 2007

Chicago Blackhawks seasons
Chicago
Chicago